Meagan Mckenzie May Whitley (born March 28, 1991) is an American, former collegiate All-American, right-handed hitting retired pro softball player originally from Spring, Texas. She attended Klein Oak High School and later attended Texas A&M University, where she played catcher on the Texas A&M Aggies softball team. She is Texas A&M softball's career leader in home runs. In 2017, her second year, she won a National Pro Fastpitch championship with the Scrap Yard Dawgs.

Statistics

Texas A&M Aggies

References

External links

Texas A&M bio

1991 births
Living people
American softball players
Softball players from Texas
Scrap Yard Dawgs players
Sportspeople from Houston
Texas A&M Aggies softball players
Softball players at the 2011 Pan American Games
Pan American Games gold medalists for the United States
Pan American Games medalists in softball
Medalists at the 2011 Pan American Games